Operation Autonomous was a clandestine operation carried out on the territory of Romania by the Special Operations Executive (SOE) set up by Winston Churchill for the duration of World War II to assist local Resistance movements.

Participants

In 1943, three British secret agents were parachuted into Romanian territory:
 Lt. Colonel Alfred Gardyne de Chastelain, experienced Special Operations Executive (SOE) officer, who was the operation's commander.
 Capt. Ivor Porter, who later wrote a book about the operation.
 Capt. Silviu Mețianu, of Romanian origin, who had previously emigrated to Great Britain.

Operation aims and outcome
The aim of the operation was primarily political:
 To persuade Romanian politicians, especially Iuliu Maniu, the leader of the National Peasants' Party, to negotiate an armistice with the Allied Powers.
 In case they were captured by authorities loyal to the Antonescu government, to convince the Romanian authorities during their interrogation, that the allies were preparing to land in the Balkans, hoping that this would induce a concentration of German troops to the east, reducing their firepower in Normandy.

On the night of 22 December 1943 the three agents were parachuted into thick fog and some distance away from the target. They were captured by Romanian gendarmerie almost immediately near the locality of Plosca, Teleorman County. They were held as well-treated prisoners of war at the Gendarmerie headquarters in Bucharest under the care of General Constantin Tobescu, Major Constantin C. Roșescu and of Major Eugen Dobrogeanu. Churchill promptly sent a message to Marshal Ion Antonescu warning him that should the British prisoners fall into German hands he would be held personally responsible. The Romanian leader had been told that de Chastelain had information which in German hands could change the outcome of the war.

.

On 23 August 1944, the young King Michael of Romania, at considerable personal risk, carried out his well prepared coup d'état which took Hitler completely by surprise and so Romania entered the war against the Axis. The British prisoners were released and that evening the King arranged for de Chastelain to fly to Istanbul from where he could go to Cairo and London to report. Mețianu stayed on for a time and then returned to England. Porter remained to maintain a radio link with SOE Headquarters until the British mission arrived. He later worked at the Legation and in 1948 returned to London to the Foreign Office.

Aftermath
After the start of the Cold War, Soviet authorities alleged that de Chastelain was keeping contacts with Maniu, the leader of the National Peasants' Party; the latter had opposed both Antonescu's regime and the Soviet occupation of Romania. During Maniu's trial for treason in 1947, the Minister of the Interior, Teohari Georgescu, was handed a report which indicated Maniu's alleged contacts with de Chastelain as proof that the politician was a British spy.

Reportedly, Cpt. Meţianu visited Romania at least once during the Cold War and visited major Roșescu at home.

In 1989, Porter's book Operation Autonomous: With SOE In Wartime Romania was published by Chatto and Windus. The translation of this book in Romanian was published by Humanitas in 1991.

In 2011, Porter attended the festivities of the Royal Jubilee, held in Bucharest, on the occasion of King Michael's 90th anniversary.

References 
 Ivor Porter – "Operation Autonomous: With SOE In Wartime Romania" Chatto and Windus. 1989
 Alesandru Duțu, Florica Dobre, Andrei Șiperco - "Pagini dintr-o istorie nescrisă: 1941–1945. Prizonieri de război în România" , in Magazin Istoric, March 1997
 Dr. ing. Alexandru Racovitză - "Mărturii despre Operațiunea Autonomous", in Clopotul Bucovinei nr. 16(42), 2007
 Aurel Pippidi - Regele și țara - Revista 22, 2006

External links
 Lt.-col. Constantin C. Roșescu, In Memoriam - schiță de biografie (Lieutnant-colonel Constantin C. Roșescu, In Memoriam - A Biographical Sketch) in Rumanian, by Răzvan Sandu

Romania in World War II
Special Operations Executive operations
Clandestine operations
Romania–United Kingdom relations
1943 in Romania